Amri Che Mat is a Malaysian social activist from Perlis state (Perlis Hope), Malaysia, who was abducted on 24 November 2016. He was one of a number of social activists who have gone missing during the same time period, including pastors Raymond Koh and Joshua Hilmy, the latter of whom disappeared along with his wife, Ruth.

Background
The then Former Leader of the Opposition and Former Deputy Prime Minister of Malaysia, Wan Azizah Wan Ismail, compared Amri's abduction to that of Raymond. Wan Azizah has asked police to explain why Amri's wife and children have been kept in the dark about his disappearance.

Following the Human Rights Commission of Malaysia's (SUHAKAM) announcement that its findings concluded that the Malaysian Special Branch (SB) was responsible for the disappearances of Amri and Raymond, and still missing , Inspector-General of Police (IGP) Abdul Hamid Bador rapped SUHAKAM for causing negative impact towards the Royal Malaysian Police (PDRM). Abdul Hamid added that he was confident that Inspector-General of Police (IGP) Mohamad Fuzi Harun, then SB Director, would provide an answer to the allegations. Former Prime Minister of Malaysia Mahathir Mohamad announced on the same day that fresh investigations will be conducted once Mohamad Fuzi retires in May 2019.

In 2020, it was said that his disappearance as well as that of Susanna Lieu's husband's disappearance were the subject of an enquiry by SUHAKAM. Lieu is suing senior members of the Malaysian police and her stand has been recognized by the US Secretary of State.

See also
List of kidnappings
List of people who disappeared

References 

2010s missing person cases
Enforced disappearances in Malaysia
Kidnapped people
Malaysian activists
Missing people
Missing person cases in Malaysia